Edward Matthew Drummond (born April 12, 1980) is a former American football wide receiver and return specialist. He was signed by the Detroit Lions as an undrafted free agent in 2002. He played college football at Penn State.

A Pro Bowl selection with the Lions in 2004, Drummond has also been a member of the Kansas City Chiefs, Pittsburgh Steelers and Las Vegas Locomotives.

Early years
Drummond attended the Linsly School in Wheeling, West Virginia and was a letterman in football and track.

College career
Although recruited by Joe Paterno as a running back, Drummond would spend his time at Penn State switching between tailback and wide receiver. He finished his collegiate career with 71 receptions for 1,132 yards and five touchdowns and rushed the ball 40 times for 272 yards and one touchdown. He caught the attention of pro scouts when he finished the 2001 Blue–Gray Football Classic as the second leading rusher with 26 yards rushing on eight carries.

Professional career

Detroit Lions
Drummond went undrafted during the 2002 NFL Draft, but was signed as an undrafted free agent when the Lions' two starting kick returners, Az-Zahir Hakim and Desmond Howard, became injured. Drummond had an outstanding rookie season, averaging 26.0 yards per kick return, ranking him third in the NFC and fifth in the NFL, and returned a punt 73 yards for a touchdown against the Arizona Cardinals.

During the Lions' opening game of the 2003 season, Drummond returned another punt 57 yards for a touchdown, also against the Arizona Cardinals, but became injured later in the season and missed a total of 10 games.

During the 2004 season, Drummond returned two kickoffs for touchdowns of 99 and 92 yards, and returned two punts for touchdowns in the same game, against the Jacksonville Jaguars. Drummond became injured later in the season and was placed on injured reserve. Drummond was voted into the NFL Pro Bowl in 2004 after returning 2 kicks and 2 punts for touchdowns, although his injury prevented him from playing.

Drummond was the 2004 recipient of the Detroit Lions/Detroit Sports Broadcasters Association/Pro Football Writers Association's Media-Friendly "Good Guy" Award. The Good Guy Award is given yearly to the Detroit Lions player who shows consideration to, and cooperation with the media at all times during the course of the season.

On August 23, 2007, the Lions released Drummond.

Kansas City Chiefs
Drummond played in 12 games for the Kansas City Chiefs throughout the 2007 season.

Pittsburgh Steelers
On July 31, 2008, Drummond was signed by the Pittsburgh Steelers. A Steelers fan while growing up, Drummond stated his desire to end his career in Pittsburgh. He was released on August 30 during final cuts.

Las Vegas Locomotives
After being out of football for two years, on June 13, 2011 Drummond signed with the Las Vegas Locomotives.

References

External links
 Pittsburgh Steelers bio
 Just Sports Stats

1980 births
Living people
Sportspeople from Pennsylvania
American football wide receivers
American football return specialists
Players of American football from Pennsylvania
Penn State Nittany Lions football players
Detroit Lions players
Kansas City Chiefs players
Pittsburgh Steelers players
National Conference Pro Bowl players
Las Vegas Locomotives players
Linsly School alumni